Yasuhiro Une (畝康 弘, Une Yasuhiro) is a paralympic athlete from Japan competing mainly in category T52 sprinting events.

Yasuhiro competed in the 1996 Summer Paralympics where he won gold in the 200m and silver in the 100m.

References

Paralympic athletes of Japan
Athletes (track and field) at the 1996 Summer Paralympics
Paralympic gold medalists for Japan
Paralympic silver medalists for Japan
Living people
Medalists at the 1996 Summer Paralympics
Year of birth missing (living people)
Paralympic medalists in athletics (track and field)
Japanese male wheelchair racers